Chakoki  is a village in Kapurthala district of Punjab State, India. The village is administrated by a Sarpanch, who is an elected representative.

Demography 
According to the report published by Census India in 2011, Chakoki has a total number of 369 houses and population of 1,891 of which include 987 males and 904 females. Literacy rate of Chakoki is 68.71%, lower than state average of 75.84%.  The population of children under the age of 6 years is 207 which is 10.95% of total population of Chakoki, and child sex ratio is approximately  971, higher than state average of 846.

Population data

Air travel connectivity 
The closest airport to the village is Sri Guru Ram Dass Jee International Airport.

Villages in Kapurthala

External links
  Villages in Kapurthala
 Kapurthala Villages List

References

Villages in Kapurthala district